Black Horse Tavern may refer to:

 Black Horse Tavern (Old Saybrook, Connecticut)
 Black Horse Tavern (Belfast, Maine)
 Black Horse Tavern (Mendham, New Jersey)
 Black Horse Tavern (Gettysburg, Pennsylvania)
 Black Horse Tavern (Canonsburg, Pennsylvania)
 Black Horse Tavern-Bellvue Hotel and Office, Roanoke, Virginia
 Black Horse, Northfield a public house in Northfield, Birmingham